The 1983 Tour of the Basque Country was the 23rd edition of the Tour of the Basque Country cycle race and was held from 4 April to 8 April 1983. The race started in Legorreta and finished at Errezil. The race was won by Julián Gorospe of the Reynolds team.

General classification

References

1983
Bas